Living It is a 2004 BBC Two Education short series, that revolves around school children lives. The three episodes last ten minutes each.

Episode list

References

External links

2004 British television series debuts
2004 British television series endings
BBC children's television shows
English-language television shows